Piero Palermini (1925–1996) was an Italian film actor. He was cast by Riccardo Freda in the 1949 swashbuckler, possibly due to a physical resemblance to the Hollywood actor Gene Kelly. Freda would come to regret this casting although Palermini would again appear for him in his 1950 production Son of d'Artagnan.

Selected filmography
 A Pilot Returns (1942)
 Special Correspondents (1943)
 Fire Over the Sea (1947)
 To Live in Peace (1947)
 The Iron Swordsman (1949)
 Buried Alive (1949)
 Faddija – La legge della vendetta (1950)
 Son of d'Artagnan (1950)
 O.K. Nerone (1951)
 Good Folk's Sunday (1953)
 Puccini (1953)
 The Knight of the Black Sword (1956)
 The Intruder (1956)
 Toto vs. Maciste (1962)
 Caesar the Conqueror (1962)
 La bellezza di Ippolita (1962)
 Planets Against Us (1962)
 The Fall of Rome (1963)
 Mussolini and I (1985)

References

Bibliography
 Curti, Roberto. Riccardo Freda: The Life and Works of a Born Filmmaker''. McFarland, 2017.

External links

1925 births
1996 deaths
Italian male film actors
Male actors from Rome